Sport Vereniging Juventud Tanki Leendert (English:Sports Club), known as Juventud TL or JTL, is an Aruban football club based in Tanki Leendert, which currently plays in Division Uno, the second tier of the national league.

Achievements

Aruban Division Uno: 1
2005–06

Players

Current squad
As of 10 September 2022

Current technical staff

External links
Juventud TL Official website 
Facebook page
Division Uno

References

Caiquetio